Nodular lichen myxedematosus is a cutaneous condition characterized by multiple nodules on the limbs and trunk, with a mild or absent papular component.

See also 
 Papular mucinosis
 List of cutaneous conditions

References 

Mucinoses